Angelo Reyes (born September 18, 1981) is a Puerto Rican professional basketball player.  Reyes was born in New York he has played in the United States American Basketball Association, the Premier Basketball League, the Dominican Republic Liga Nacional de Baloncesto, the Mexico Liga Nacional de Baloncesto Profesional, the Uruguayan Federacion Uruguaya de Basquetbol FUBB, the Australian National Basketball League, and the Puerto Rican Baloncesto Superior Nacional. Reyes has been a member of the Puerto Rican National Team since 2006.

Professional career
Reyes played junior-college ball at Neosho County Community College in Kansas. He has since played in the Baloncesto Superior Nacional (BSN) with Titanes de Morovis (2002), Criollos de Caguas (2004) Caciques de Humacao (2005), Criollos de Caguas (2006) Reyes led Caguas to the 2006 Puerto Rican championship and led the league in rebound, Gigantes de Carolina, (2007-2009) Reyes won the 2007 Most Valuable Player (MVP) 2008 lost the championship in 7 games, Capitanes de Arecibo, (2010) Reyes won the 2010 Puerto Rican championship with Arecibo, Cangrejeros de Santurce. (2011),  Piratas de Quebradillas (2013-2015) Reyes won the 2013 Puerto Rican championship with Quebradillas, Leones de Ponce (2016). Reyes has led the BSN in rebounding. Reyes was selected Most Valuable Player of the league in 2007 while playing with the Gigantes de Carolina after averaging 19.7 PPG and 11.9 RPG.

Reyes was a member of the Puerto Rican National Basketball Team in 2006, participating in the Central American and Caribbean Games earning the Gold Medal, and at the World Championship in Japan.

Due to Reyes' outstanding play during the 2007 FIBA Americas Championship, he earned an invitation to the Milwaukee Bucks preseason training camp.

Reyes was excluded from the roster of the Milwaukee Bucks and released because of failing his physical due to injury. Reyes signed with the Wollongong Hawks for the NBL season,

In August 2008, he signed with Hebraica y Macabi in Uruguay.

National team career
During the summer of 2007, Reyes represented Puerto Rico as a member of the Puerto Rican National Basketball Team during the 2007 Pan American Games winning the Silver Medal, CaribeBasket 2007 winning the Gold Medal, and the 2007 FIBA Americas Championship winning the Bronze Medal. On this tournament, Reyes was second in rebounds per game averaging 9.5, outrebounding players like Amar'e Stoudemire and Dwight Howard. He is represented by agent, Ralph Menar.

References

External links
Profile at Eurobasket.com
BSN Profile

1981 births
Living people
Baloncesto Superior Nacional players
Basketball players at the 2007 Pan American Games
Caciques de Humacao players
Central American and Caribbean Games gold medalists for Puerto Rico
Competitors at the 2006 Central American and Caribbean Games
Leones de Ponce basketball players
Neosho County Panthers men's basketball players
Pan American Games silver medalists for Puerto Rico
Pan American Games medalists in basketball
Piratas de Quebradillas players
Puerto Rican men's basketball players
Puerto Rico men's national basketball team players
2006 FIBA World Championship players
Power forwards (basketball)
Central American and Caribbean Games medalists in basketball
Medalists at the 2007 Pan American Games
Criollos de Caguas basketball players